St John the Baptist's Church, Croxall is a Grade II* listed parish church in the Church of England in Croxall.

History

The earliest parts of the church are the chancel of c.1200. The church is noted for its fine collection of memorials.

Memorials

George Curzon (d. 1605) 
Mary Curzon (d. 1612) 
Henrie Curzon (d. 1639)
Christopher Horton (d. 1714) 
Waltar Horton (d. 1716)
Christopher Horton (d. 1659)
Christopher Horton  (d.1701)
Eusebius Horton (d. 1823) and Phoebe Horton (d. 1814) by Sir Francis Leggatt Chantrey
Harriet Louise Wilmot Horton (d. 1831)
Sir Robert Wilmot-Horton, 3rd Baronet (d. 1841) by Denman
Margaret Prinsep (d. 1843), Caroline Mary Prinsep (d. 1842), Frances Levett (d. 1835) by Reeves of Bath
Revd. Samuel Holworthy (d. 1838)

See also
Grade II* listed buildings in Lichfield (district)
Listed buildings in Edingale

References

Church of England church buildings in Staffordshire
Grade II* listed churches in Staffordshire